Plan C is a non-profit organization and campaign for access to medical abortion. It was founded in 2015 by Francine Coeytaux, Elisa Wells, and Amy Merrill as a project under the fiscal sponsorship of the National Women's Health Network. The organization serves as an educational resource to help inform people how they can access Mifepristone and Misoprostol abortion pills.

The Plan C organization was the subject of a film of the same name, Plan C (film), that premiered at the 2023 Sundance Film Festival on January 23, 2023. The film focuses on Plan C's efforts to expand access to abortion across the United States via the distribution of at-home abortion pills ordered from the internet and delivered through the mail.

References

External links
Plan C
Plan C on Twitter

Organizations established in 2015
Women's health movement
Abortion-rights organizations in the United States
Feminism in the United States
Health and disability rights organizations in the United States
Health charities in the United States
Non-profit organizations based in the United States